Aline Barros Kistenmacker dos Santos (born October 7, 1976), better known as Aline Barros is a singer, songwriter, presenter and manager in Brazil. Some of her albums have been certified multiple Diamond by the Associação Brasileira dos Produtores de Discos (ABPD).

Aline Barros played Snow White, the movie Aline Barros: Escola de Princesas

Partial discography 
The following discography is limited to albums which were certified by the Associação Brasileira dos Produtores de Discos (ABPD).

Studio albums

Children's albums

Collections

Filmography 

Aline Barros: Escola de Princesas - Snow White

Awards nominations 

Latin Grammy Awards

References

External links
 

Brazilian songwriters
Brazilian evangelicals
Living people
1976 births
Performers of contemporary Christian music
Brazilian gospel singers
Latin Grammy Award winners
Christian music songwriters
Portuguese-language singers
Spanish-language singers of Brazil
21st-century Brazilian singers
21st-century Brazilian women singers
Women in Latin music